Muhammar is a traditional dish from Bahrain. It is a sweet rice dish seasoned with spices and date molasses, and is usually eaten with fried or grilled fish. The rice is parboiled and then steamed.

See also

 Musakhan: a Jordanian and Palestinian dish, also known as muhammar.

References

Arab cuisine
Bahraini cuisine
Rice dishes